Acromargarita cuyosae is a species of sea snail, a marine gastropod mollusk in the family Mitridae, the miters or miter snails.

Description
The length of the shell attains 5.8 mm.

Distribution
This marine species occurs off the Philippines.

References

 Poppe G.T. (2008) New Fissurellidae, Epitoniidae, Aclididae, Mitridae and Costellariidae from the Philippines. Visaya 2(3): 37-63. 
  Huang, S.-I. (2021). A new genus Acromargarita n. gen. and four new Mitridae from the Indo-Pacific Ocean (Mollusca: Gastropoda). Visaya. 5(5): 79-94

Mitridae
Gastropods described in 2008